Lake Anna is one of the largest freshwater inland reservoirs in Virginia, covering an area of , and located  south of Washington, D.C., in Louisa and Spotsylvania counties (and partially in Orange County at the northern tip). The lake is easily accessible from Fredericksburg, Richmond, Charlottesville, Northern Virginia, and Washington, D.C., and is one of the most popular recreational lakes in the state.

History
In 1968, Virginia Electric and Power Company (now Dominion) purchased  of farmlands in three counties along the North Anna and Pamunkey rivers to provide clean, fresh water to help cool the nuclear power generating plants at the North Anna Nuclear Generating Station adjacent to the lake. By 1972, the lake bottom was cleared of all timber, and the dam was nearing completion. It was projected to take three years to completely fill the lake, but with the additional rainfall from Hurricane Agnes, the lake was full in only 18 months. The first communities began to spring up around the lake at that time, and now some 120 different communities surround its shores. In June 1978, the first of the two reactors went into commercial operation. The second unit followed in December 1980.

Description
The lake is divided into two sides: the public side (also known as the "cold" side) and the private side, working as a cooling pond (also known as the "hot" side). The private side is formed of three main bodies of water, connected by navigable canals. The public and private sides are divided by three stone dikes. The private side has no marinas or public access ramps; only property owners and North Anna Power Station employees have access to the waters on the private side. The public side has several marinas and boat launches, including a boat ramp at an adjacent state park. The public side sees significantly higher boat traffic compared to the private side, especially on summer weekends.

The public side is known as the "cold" side because it provides water to cool the generators at the power plant; the private or "hot" side receives warm water discharge from the power plant. The private side can be substantially warmer than the public side, especially near the discharge point, where it can be too hot for swimming. The private side has an extended water sports season. Some water circulates back out of the private side into the public side through underground channels; consequently, the public side is warmer in the southern area near the dam. In the winter, some fish migrate to these warmer waters.

Preliminary steps to add a third reactor have led to protests by environmentalists and property owners, who fear a subsequent increase in the water temperature and a decrease in the water level, particularly on the private side. According to Dominion, the water discharged from the plant is usually about  warmer than the intake water.

North Anna Dam

The dam's hydroelectric power plant is located on the west side of the spillway and is supplied with water via a  penstock. The plant consists of two small open runner turbine-generators, the larger with a 775 kW capacity and the smaller rated at 225 kW for a combined installed capacity of 1 megawatt.

Use and recreation

Events
Lake Anna is the site of several major annual events. The Kinetic Race weekend takes place every May; this is a half-distance race, followed by a sprint-distance race. The Giant Acorn Triathlon weekend occurs every fall and features an international/Olympic-distance triathlon, followed by a sprint-distance triathlon the following day.

See also
Gold mining in Virginia
Bumpass, Virginia
Jerdone Castle

References

Bodies of water of Louisa County, Virginia
Bodies of water of Orange County, Virginia
Bodies of water of Spotsylvania County, Virginia
Protected areas of Louisa County, Virginia
Protected areas of Orange County, Virginia
Protected areas of Spotsylvania County, Virginia
Anna
Dominion Energy
Cooling ponds